In electrical engineering and computer science, analog image processing is any image processing task conducted on two-dimensional analog signals by analog means (as opposed to digital image processing).
Basically any data can be represented in two types named as 
1.Analog 
2.Digital
if the pictorial representation of the data represented in analog wave formats that can be named as analog image.
E.g.: 
television broadcasting in older days.. through the dish antenna systems..
Where as the digital representation or storing the data in digital form is termed as a digital image processing 
E.g.:image data stored in digital logic gates..

References 

Image processing